Pseudambassis roberti is a species of fish in the family Ambassidae, the Asiatic glassfishes. It is sole species in the genus. It is endemic to Burma. The Catalog of Fishes classifies this species as Parambassis robertsi. The specific name honours the American ichthyologist Tyson R. Roberts.

References

Ambassidae
Monotypic fish genera
Endemic fauna of Myanmar
Fish described in 1993